Darjeeling District Newspaper Sellers' Union, a trade union of newspaper sellers in the Darjeeling District, West Bengal, India. DDNSU is affiliated to the Centre of Indian Trade Unions. The union president is Nantu Paul.

Trade unions in India
Centre of Indian Trade Unions
Trade unions in West Bengal
Organizations with year of establishment missing